Menua ( [variations exist]), also rendered Meinua or Minua, was the fifth known king of Urartu from c. 810 BC to approximately 786 BC. In Armenian, Menua is rendered as Menua. The name Menua may be connected etymologically to the Ancient Greek names Minos and Minyas. 

A younger son of the preceding Urartian King, Ishpuini, Menua was adopted as co-ruler by his father in the last years of his reign. Menua enlarged the kingdom through numerous wars against the neighbouring countries and left many inscriptions across the region, by far the most of any Urartian ruler. He organized a centralised administrative structure, fortified a number of towns and constructed fortresses. Amongst these was Menuakhinili located near Mount Ararat (its exact location is uncertain, perhaps at Bulakbaşı, east of modern-day Iğdır). Menua developed a canal and irrigation system that stretched across the kingdom. The most significant of these was a 45 mile canal from the Hoşap valley to Van, which was named the Menua Canal after the king. It flowed at a rate of 1500 to 3000 litres of water per second, depending on the time of the year. Several of these canals are still in use today.

He briefly co-ruled with his son, Inushpua, but was succeeded by another son, Argishti I. Menua also had a daughter named Tariria, after whom a certain vineyard was named Taririakhinli.

It is believed that Menua founded the city of Manazkert (Malazgirt).

See also

 List of kings of Urartu
 Malazgirt

References

Urartian kings
9th-century BC rulers
8th-century BC rulers
9th-century BC births
Year of death unknown